Gustaf Jacob af Dalström was a Swedish military and civil servant.

Biography
Gustaf Jacob af Dalström was the son of the parish priest Erik Dahlström and his wife Christina Julin and married in 1816 to Anna Christina Hållander. He was the father of the military commander Oskar af Dalström.

Military career

Dalström became an ensign in the Upplands Land Guard in 1808, he participated with distinction in the Finnish War and became a lieutenant after the Battle of Lemo on 19 August 1808. In 1813 he was appointed captain of the Älvsborg Regiment and in 1818 became a major in the General Staff colonel in 1831 and promoted to major general in 1848. In the War of the Sixth Coalition Dalström participated as chief of staff in the 4th Brigade and was severely wounded in the Combat of Roßlau. In 1833 Dalström was knighted, and from 1821 to 1836, he served as a major at the Military Academy Karlberg and was a commander of the Älvsborg Regiment from 1836 to 1848. In 1848 he became commander of a brigade of the Swedish observation corps on Funen and in September of the same year the highest commander of the Swedish troops remaining in Denmark. In 1849, Dalström became governor and military commander on Gotland and in 1853–1854 was the highest commander of the troops withdrawn to the protection of neutrality. In 1858 he was dismissed.

Awards
För tapperhet i fält, September 29, 1813 (Promoted to Commander on October 14, 1844 and granted Grand Cross on December 18, 1854)
Order of the Sword, January 28, 1816
Hederssabel, 1826
Karl Johansmedaljen

Foreign Awards
Denmark: Order of the Dannebrog

References

1785 births
1867 deaths
Governors of Gotland
Swedish Army major generals
Swedish nobility
19th-century Swedish politicians